Tegulata may refer to:
 Teulisna, a genus of moths
 Tigullia, an ancient town of Liguria, Italy